Pa Pae may refer to:

Pa Pae, Mae Sariang
Pa Pae, Mae Taeng